Željko Ljubenović (Serbian Cyrillic: Жељко Љубеновић; born 9 July 1981) is a retired Serbian professional footballer who played as a midfielder.

After playing almost exclusively for second-tier clubs in his homeland, Ljubenović spent most of his footballing career in Ukraine, representing four clubs and amassing over 250 appearances in the country's top league.

Career
Born in Belgrade, Ljubenović started out as a trainee at Partizan in 1990. He spent five years in the club's youth setup, before switching to OFK Beograd in 1995. After completing his formation, Ljubenović made his senior debuts with the Romantičari in the 2000–01 First League of FR Yugoslavia. He subsequently played for Second League clubs Mladenovac, Mladost Lukićevo, and Proleter Zrenjanin. In the summer of 2005, Ljubenović signed with top-flight side Hajduk Kula. He spent just half a season there, before transferring abroad.

In the 2006 winter transfer window, Ljubenović moved to Ukraine and signed with Kryvbas Kryvyi Rih. He switched clubs the following summer and joined fellow top-tier club Tavriya Simferopol. Over the next five and a half years, Ljubenović played regularly for the side and recorded near 200 appearances in all competitions. He left the club midway through the 2011–12 season, eventually joining another Premier League side, Oleksandriya. In the summer of 2012, Ljubenović signed with Zorya Luhansk. After 6 seasons in Zorya he retired in May 2018. In July 2018 Zorya's general director Serhiy Rafailov announced that Ljubenović will work in the club as scout in Balkan region.

Honours
Tavriya Simferopol
 Ukrainian Cup: 2009–10
 Ukrainian Super Cup: Runner-up 2010
Zorya Luhansk
 Ukrainian Cup: Runner-up 2015–16

References

External links

 Official website
 Tavriya profile
 
 
 

Association football midfielders
Expatriate footballers in Ukraine
First League of Serbia and Montenegro players
FC Kryvbas Kryvyi Rih players
FC Oleksandriya players
FC Zorya Luhansk players
FK Hajduk Kula players
FK Proleter Zrenjanin players
OFK Beograd players
OFK Mladenovac players
SC Tavriya Simferopol players
Serbian expatriate footballers
Serbian expatriate sportspeople in Ukraine
Serbian footballers
Footballers from Belgrade
Ukrainian Premier League players
1981 births
Living people